Beeline Highway may refer to:
Beeline Highway (Arizona), State Route 87
Beeline Highway (Florida), State Road 710
Beeline Highway (auto trail)